Sarah Anthony is a Democratic member of the Michigan Senate.

Anthony was born December 2, 1983, in Lansing, Michigan. Anthony has earned a bachelor’s degree in political science from Central Michigan University and a Master of Public Administration from Western Michigan University. She served as a legislative aide to Representative Joan Bauer and as deputy director of Michigan College Access Network. She has served as a member of Capital  Area  Michigan Works! Administrative Board, Capital Area United Way Community Investment Committee, Greater Lansing Food Bank Board; Lansing Economic Area Partnership Board; and the Michigan League of Conservation Voters.

Anthony was elected in 2012 to the Ingham County Board of Commissioners. She was the youngest African-American woman to serve in on this board or on any board like it in the United States. Anthony is also the first African-American woman in Michigan's history to serve a partial term in the Michigan House of Representatives.

Anthony was elected to the Michigan Senate's 21st district in 2022.

References

External links 
 Sarah Anthony at housedems.org
 Sarah Anthony at ballotpedia.org
 Sarah Anthony at votesmart.org

Living people
African-American women in politics
African-American state legislators in Michigan
Politicians from Lansing, Michigan
Central Michigan University alumni
Western Michigan University alumni
County commissioners in Michigan
Democratic Party members of the Michigan House of Representatives
Democratic Party Michigan state senators
Women state legislators in Michigan
21st-century American politicians
21st-century American women politicians
Year of birth missing (living people)
21st-century African-American women
21st-century African-American politicians